KF CAKRAN is an Albanian football club based in the small town of Cakran. KF Çakrani is currently not competing in the senior football league.

References

External links
Second Division Standings and Stats
Albania Sport, Second Division

Cakrani
1996 establishments in Albania
Sport in Fier
Association football clubs established in 1996